Vicente Rojas Lizcano (October 26, 1879, in Chinácota, Colombia – March 1, 1943, in Pamplona, Colombia), known as Biófilo Panclasta, was a political activist, writer, and Colombian individualist anarchist. In 1904 he began to use the pseudonym by which he was later known: Biófilo, lover of life, and Panclasta, enemy of all. He traveled to more than fifty countries, agitating for anarchist ideas and taking part in worker and union demonstrations, in the course of which he befriended such people as Kropotkin, Maxim Gorky, and Lenin.

Biography

Early life
The son of Bernardo Rojas and Simona Lizcano, a working-class woman, Biófilo began his studies in Pamplona, a city close to Chinácota. From 1897 to 1898 he was in the Escuela Normal of Bucaramanga, from which he was expelled for publishing a small periodical in which he denounced the re-election of president Miguel Antonio Caro. Here is a popular quote of his: "Being ruled over is just as repulsive a thought  to me as being ruler. Each man must be his own road, I don´t follow and I´ll never ask to be followed"

Participation in the Venezuelan Revolution
In 1899 he left school and traveled to Venezuela, where, with Eleazar López Contreras, he founded the first Public School in the town of Capacho Nuevo, the capital of the Independencia municipality (State of Táchira). That same year he signs up for the army of the Venezuelan Cipriano Castro, which had as its goal the downfall of president Ignacio Andrade. He soon left this group behind and wandered around Venezuela with other revolutionary groups that prowled through Trujillo, Portuguesa, Cojedes and Carabobo. He arrived at the city of Valencia in January 1900. In November 1904 he traveled to the Colombian city of Baranquilla, now as a coronel in the army of Cipriano Castro; he offered his support as a fighter to the Colombian forces against the Panamanian separatists supported by the United States.

First contacts with Anarchism
In 1906 he traveled to Buenos Aires, Argentina. There his contact with anarchist and socialist thought began as he attended meetings and wrote for partisan newspapers. That same year, he left for Europe as a delegate of the Federación Obrera Regional Argentina to the Workers' Congress in Amsterdam. In the Netherlands he was invited by the Social Studies group to give the opposing opinion to a talk by Bestraud called "Anarchy Against Life."

Revolutionary Activity in Colombia
In 1908 he was exiled from Spain at the request of the Colombian president, Rafael Reyes. He arrived in Puerto Colombia with the plan of continuing to Bogotá; however, he chose to travel again and take refugue in Panama, from which he was once again exiled by order of Rafael Reyes. He was imprisoned and turned over to Colombian authorities. From then on Biófilo Panclasta would only leave one prison to enter another: he was jailed in Cartagena (1909), Barranquilla (1910) and Bogotá (1911). Certain national newspapers such as Maquetas demanded the death sentence for him, stating that he was a danger to public order.

Return to Venezuela: Valencia Prison
"The prisoners who had seen me enter into the cell were careful, in their entrance, not to trip over my cold, weak body. One of them felt with his hand my flesh, which did not shudder because I had already suffered all pain, and observing that I neither moved nor spoke, exclaimed sadly and softly, 'They hung this one in the Police Station and brought him to die here.'" 

Biófilo returned to the Venezuelan city of Valencia in 1914. There he was imprisoned giving a speech in praise of the French nation in a public square, days after the beginning of the First World War. The real reason he was imprisoned was the orders given by the underlings of president Juan Vicente Gómez, who had succeeded Cipriano Castro, Panclasta's friend, in a coup d'état. During the seven years he remained in prison, Biófilo was subjected to forced labor, deprivation, and hunger, according to each successive warden's wishes. He spent his prison years with various Venezuelan political prisoners, many of whom died in that jail. In 1921, thanks to a warden assigned by the recently named governor of the state of Carabobo, José Antonio Baldó, Biófilo was transferred to Castillo Libertador, where he was treated more humanely and set free in a few months.

Revolutionary activity around the world
In 1923, two years after leaving the Valencia prison, Biófilo was selected as delegate of the Mexican Anarchist Association to a congress in Barcelona. There he proposed a project named Operation Europe, which had as its goal:
  

The following year he traveled to São Paulo to help organize a coffee-growers' strike, but was once more jailed and transferred to the city of Cayena, from which he escaped. The League of the Rights of Man sent him to Martinique; having secretly visited fifty-two countries, he returned to Colombia. There he was imprisoned together with the syndicalist Raúl Mahecha, in the city of San Gil. The following year, in Bogotá, he founded the Centro de Unión y Acción Revolucionaria [Center for Revolutionary Unity and Action], whose lemma was: "Revolutionaries of all ideals, unite!"

Last years
In 1934, Biófilo Panclasta began cohabiting with Julia Ruiz, a well-known fortune teller who worked in Bogotá. He dedicated his time to writing for newspapers and granting interviews, also sending letters to some Latin American presidents. His companion died in January 1939. One year later, Biófilo attempted suicide in Barranquilla, electrocuting himself and cutting his throat with a straight razor. In December of that year, the Bucaramanga police banned him from the city for being a derelict and an alcoholic. He died on March 1, 1943, in the old folk's home of Pamplona, from a tremendous heart attack.

Anarchist Thought
Biófilo Panclasta's ideas on anarchism were quite idiosyncratic. He oscillated between individualist anarchism and social anarchism, which can be seen in a series of letters he wrote from Barranquilla prison in 1910. At first, Biófilo presented himself as an extreme and radical individualist, echoing the ideas of his favorite philosopher, Nietzsche. Biófilo hated the herd:

For Panclasta, the social struggle he carried out was not for others, but for himself, to feel alive. Fighting for others allowed him, he said, to unfold all his capacities for action, for love or hate.

But Biófilo was just as capable of identifying with social anarchism. Biófilo's opinions on both currents of anarchism are of a piece with his overall way of thinking, that of someone who hated absolutes and extremes, who thought that people are neither completely social nor entirely individual. He tried to distance himself from any form of political militancy, even anarchist organizations. He wrote of a conversation with Kropotkin where he told him:

Biófilo Panclasta's way of thinking shows that, more than a man of ideas, he was a man of action. Biófilo used the need that people have to free themselves from oppression to act from; for him, organizations are effective only in practice, not in a programmatic sense. They work based on human interests, which he called situational interests.

Works
Books in English translation
 Seven Years Buried Alive. Seattle: Ritmomaquia, 2013.
Books in Spanish
 PANCLASTA, Biófilo (1932): "Siete años enterrado vivo en una de las mazmorras de Gomezuela". Tipografía la Libertad, Bogotá.
 VILLANUEVA, Orlando; VEGA, Renán; GAMBOA, Juan, CLAVIJO, Amadeo; FAJARDO, Luis (1992): "Biófilo Panclasta, el eterno prisionero". Ediciones Alas de Xue.

References

External links
 Biófilo Panclasta's works at TheAnarchistLibrary.org

1879 births
1943 deaths
Anarchist writers
Beggars
Colombian anarchists
Colombian male writers
Colombian non-fiction writers
Colombian political writers
Egoist anarchists
Individualist anarchists
Political activists